Buckhorn is a ghost town in Eureka County, state of Nevada, in the United States.

History

In the winter of 1908 gold ore was discovered by five prospectors in the place which became Buckhorn. These prospectors sold their claim to mining magnate George Wingfield who formed the "Buckhorn Company" in 1910 and started the mining activities.  The Post Office was in operation from February 1910 until May 1916.  In 1914 300 people lived in Buckhorn. However, the Buckhorn veins were weaker than the expected and production has dropped in 1914 and 1915. The mine has closed in 1917 and was reopened in 1935, but the results were weak the mine was closed. Nowadays the only remains of the old town are the mill foundations and of another buildings.

References

Ghost towns in Eureka County, Nevada
Ghost towns in Nevada